Gangwon Province or Gangwon-do was one of the Eight Provinces of Korea during the Joseon Dynasty.  The province was formed in 1395, and derived its name from the names of the principal cities of Gangneung (강릉; 江陵) and the provincial capital Wonju (원주; 原州).

In 1895, Gangwon-do was replaced by the Districts of Chuncheon (Chuncheon-bu; 춘천부; 春川府) in the west and Gangneung (Gangneung-bu; 강릉부; 江陵府) in the east. (Wonju later became part of Chungju District.)

In 1896, Korea was redivided into thirteen provinces, and the two districts were merged to re-form Gangwon-do Province.  Although Wonju rejoined Gangwon-do province, the provincial capital was moved to Chuncheon (춘천; 春川).

With the division of Korea in 1945, the subsequent establishment of separate North and South Korean governments in 1948, and the conclusion of the Korean War in 1953, Gangwon came to be divided into separate provinces once again:  Gangwon-do (South Korea) and Kangwon-do (North Korea).

Notes and References

See also 
History of Korea
Gangwon Province, South Korea

Provinces of Korea
Joseon dynasty
Divided regions